Carrefour Meridien is a village in the Torbeck commune in the Les Cayes Arrondissement, in the Sud department of Haiti. It is located 1 kilometer southwest of the town of Torbeck on Route Nationale #2.

References

Populated places in Sud (department)